Eysenhardtia is a genus of flowering plants in the family Fabaceae. It belongs to the subfamily Faboideae. Members of the genus are commonly known as kidneywoods.

Species
Eysenhardtia comprises the following species:
 Eysenhardtia adenostylis Baill.

 Eysenhardtia drummondii Torr. & A. Gray
 Eysenhardtia officinalis Cruz Durán & M. Sousa

 Eysenhardtia orthocarpa (A.Gray) S.Watson—Tahitian kidneywood
 Eysenhardtia parvifolia Brandegee
 Eysenhardtia peninsularis Brandegee
 Eysenhardtia platycarpa Pennell & Saff.
 Eysenhardtia polystachya (Ortega) Sarg.
 Eysenhardtia punctata Pennell

 Eysenhardtia schizocalyx Pennell
 Eysenhardtia spinosa A. Gray—spiny kidneywood
 Eysenhardtia subcoriacea Pennell
 Eysenhardtia texana Scheele—Texas kidneywood

Species names with uncertain taxonomic status
The status of the following species is unresolved:
 Eysenhardtia spinosa Engelm.

References

External links

 
Fabaceae genera
Trees of Guatemala